Manda pitha is a steamed pitha which is prepared in Odisha, India during festivals falling on monsoon and post-monsoon seasons like Manabasa Gurubara, Durga Puja, Kumar Purnima or Rakhi Purnima. The pitha resembles modak of Maharashtra and Kozhakkattai of South India.
The name is derived from Odia word "Mandeiba" means "to place" or "to put" or "to dump" it also suggests the action of putting rice bowl into the warm water "Mandeiba" to Manda peetha.

Preparation
The outer covering consists of steamed rice flour and inner filling is of coconut, jaggery, black pepper and Chhena.

See also
Kakara pitha
List of Indian breads
 List of steamed foods
 
 Manda Pitha

References
guide to make manda pitha

Odia cuisine
Indian breads
Articles containing video clips
Steamed foods